Carlos Andres Manrique (born November 10, 1959, in Havana, Cuba) was a member of the Florida House of Representatives as a Republican from 1992 to 1994 for District 115.

He graduated from Belen Jesuit Preparatory School in Miami in June 1978.  He was the legislative aide to Representative Javier D. Souto for four years when he ran for State Representative the first time in 1988 against Mario Díaz-Balart. In 1994, he lost his re-election bid to Alex Diaz de la Portilla. In 2004, Manrique ran for State House seat 114 but lost that election in the Republican primary.

References
 The International Jesuit Alumni Directory Belen (Miami, Florida:Forum Press Inc., 1994)
 The International Jesuit Alumni Directory Belen (Miami, Florida: Bernard C. Harris Publishing Company Inc., 2004) MCNH-W54-4-4.OVA
 The Miami Herald, Manrique Beats Ex-Fire Chief In House Race, November 4, 1992
 El Nuevo Herald, Fiscalia Investiga A Legislador Por Presunta Golpiza; May 14, 1993
 The Miami Herald,  House Dist. 115 Race Boils, July 28, 1988
 The Miami Herald, DISTRICT 115 RACE TURNS INTO NASTY RERUN OF '92 CONTEST, September 4, 1994
 The Miami Herald, 4 Of 5 Legislators Cruise To Victory, September 9, 1994
 The Miami Herald, MANRIQUE ELECTED CHAIR OF CAUCUS,  November 28, 1993
 The Miami Herald, STATE REP. SOUTO FEELS THE HEAT, BYPASSES AIDE IN HOUSE RACE,  June 20, 1988
 The Miami Herald, FLores Wins Big In GOP Primary, September 5, 2004

1959 births
People from Havana
Republican Party members of the Florida House of Representatives
Living people
American politicians of Cuban descent
Hispanic and Latino American state legislators in Florida
Cuban emigrants to the United States